The chiefdoms of Sierra Leone are the third-level units of administration in Sierra Leone. There are 190 chiefdoms in Sierra Leone, as of 2017. Previously, there were 149.

History and organisation 
The paramount chiefs and the ruling families in the chiefdoms were recognised and empowered by the British colonial administration when it organised the Protectorate of Sierra Leone in 1896. Typically, chiefs have the power to "raise taxes, control the judicial system, and allocate land, the most important resource in rural areas."

The hereditary paramount chiefs and their sub-chiefs were the sole local government in Sierra Leone until 2004, when the World Bank sponsored the creation of elected local councils. Local notables, known as the Tribal Authority, elect paramount chiefs for life from among the ruling families in each chieftaincy recognised by the British administration in 1896. 

Some chieftaincies have several ruling families, and the differences among them in terms of economic progress has been subject to study in 2013. They found there was a positive relationship between the number of ruling families in a chieftaincy and educational, health and economic outcomes in terms of human capital. 

The districts of Sierra Leone were divided into 149 chiefdoms of chieftaincies until 2017, as listed below as of 2011. Since 2017, they have been divided into 190 chiefdoms.

Eastern Province

Kailahun District
Dea – Baiwala
Jaluahun – Segbwema
Jawei – Daru
Kissi Kama – Dea
Kissi Teng – Kangama
Kissi Tongi – Buedu
Luawa – Kailahun
Malema – Jojoima
Mandu – Mobai
Peje Bongre – Manowa
Peje West – Bunumbu
Penguia – Sandar
Upper Bambara – Pendembu
Yawei – Bandajuma

Kenema District
Dama – Giema
Dodo – Dodo
Gaura – Joru
Gorama Mende – Tungie
Kandu Leppiam – Gbado
Koya – Baoma
Langurama Ya – Baima
Lower Bambara – Panguma
Malegohun – Sembehun
Niawa – Sundumei
Nomo – Faama
Nongowa – Kenema
Simbaru – Boajibu
Small Bo – Blama
Tunkia – Gorahun
Wando – Faala

Kono District
Fiama – Njagbwema
Gbane Kandor – Koardu
Gbane – Ngandorhun
Gbense – Yardu
Gorama Kono – Kangama
Kamara – Tombodu
Lei – Siama
Mafindor – Kamiendor
Nimikoro – Njaiama
Nimiyama – Sewafe
Sandor – Kayima
Soa – Kainkordu
Tankoro – New Sembehun
Toli – Kondewakor

Northern Province

Bombali District
Biriwa – Kamabai
Bombali Shebora – Makeni
Gbanti Kamaranka – Kamaranka
Gbendembu Ngowahun – Kalangba
Libeisaygahun – Batkanu
Magbaiamba Ndowahun – Hunduwa
Makari Gbanti – Masongbon
Paki Massabong – Mapaki
Safroko Limba – Binkolo
Sanda Loko – Kamalo
Sanda Tenraren – Mateboi
Sella Limba – Kamakwie
Tambakha – Fintonia

Koinadugu District
Dembelia Sikunia – Sikunia
Diang – Kondembaia
Folasaba – Musaia
Kasunko – Fadugu
Mongo – Bendugu
Neya – Krubola
Nieni – Yiffin
Sengbe – Yogomaia
Sulima – Falaba
Wara-Wara Bafodia – Bafodea
Wara-Wara Yagala – Gbawuria

Tonkolili District
Gbonkolenken – Yele
Kafe Simiria – Mabonto
Kalanthuba – Kamankay
Dansogoia - Bumbuna
Kholifa Mabang - Mabang
Kholifa Rowalla – Magburaka
Kunike – Masingbi
Kunike Barina – Makali
Malal Mara – Rochin
Sambaia – Bendugu
Tane – Matotoka
Yoni – Yonibana

North Western Province

Kambia District
Brimaia – Kukuna
Gbinle Dixing – Tawuya
Magbema – Kambia
Mambolo – Mambolo
Masungbala – Kawula
Samu – Kychum
Tonko Limba – Madina

Port Loko District
Bureh Kasseh – Mange
Buya Romende – Foredugu
Debia – Gbinti
Kaffu Bullom – Mahera
Koya – Songo
Loko Masama – Petifu
Maforki – Port Loko
Marampa – Lunsar
Masimera – Masimera
Sanda Magbolontor – Sendugu
T.M. Safroko – Miraykulay

Southern Province

Bo District
Badjia – Ngelehun
Bagbo – Jimmi
Bagbwe – Ngarlu
Baoma – Baoma
Bumpe–Gao – Bumpe
Gbo – Gbo
Jaiama Bongor – Telu
Kakua – Bo town
Komboya – Njala
Lugbu – Sumbuya
Niawa Lenga – Nengbema
Selenga – Dambala
Tikonko – Tikonko
Valunia – Mongere
Wonde – Gboyama

Bonthe District
Bendu – Cha Bendu
Bum – Madina
Dema – Tissana
Imperri – Gbangbama
Jong – Mattru
Kpanda – Kemo Motuo
Kwamebai Krim – Benduma
Nongoba Bullom – Gbap
Sittia – Yonni
Sogbini – Tihun
Yawbeko – Talia

Moyamba District
Bagruwa – Sembehun
Banta – Gbangbatoke
Bumpe – Rotifunk
Dasse – Mano
Fakunya – Gandohun
Kagboro – Shenge
Kaiyamba – Moyamba
Kamajei – Senehun
Kongbora – Bauya
Kori – Taiama
Kowa – Njama
Ribbi – Bradford
Timdale – Bomotoke
Upper Banta – Mokelle

Pujehun District
Barri – Potoru
Gallines Perri – Blama
Kpaka – Masam
Kpanga Kabonde – Pujehun town
Makpele – Zimmi
Malen – Sahn
Mano Sa Krim – Gbonjema
Kpanga Krim – Gobaru
Peje – Futta
Sorogbema – Fairo
Sowa – Bandajuma
Yakemo Kpukumu Krim – Karlu

See also 
 Administrative divisions of Sierra Leone

References

External links
Sierra Leone.org

 
Subdivisions of Sierra Leone
Sierra Leone, Chiefdoms
Sierra Leone 3
Chiefdoms, Sierra Leone
Sierra Leone geography-related lists